Sand Beach Township is a civil township of Huron County in the U.S. state of Michigan.  The population was 1,470 at the 2000 census.

The city of Harbor Beach is mostly surrounded by the township but is administered autonomously.

Communities 

Geography

Demographics
As of the census of 2000, there were 1,470 people, 562 households, and 405 families residing in the township. There were 750 housing units at an average density of 20.6 per square mile (8.0/km). The racial makeup of the township was 97.76% White, 0.34% Native American, 0.61% Asian, 0.61% from other races, and 0.68% from two or more races. Hispanic or Latino of any race were 1.29% of the population.

There were 562 households, out of which 32.2% had children under the age of 18 living with them, 65.3% were married couples living together, 4.4% had a female householder with no husband present, and 27.9% were non-families. 26.5% of all households were made up of individuals, and 16.9% had someone living alone who was 65 years of age or older.  The average household size was 2.61 and the average family size was 3.18.

In the township the population was spread out, with 28.0% under the age of 18, 6.3% from 18 to 24, 23.4% from 25 to 44, 22.3% from 45 to 64, and 20.0% who were 65 years of age or older.  The median age was 40 years. For every 100 females, there were 105.0 males.  For every 100 females age 18 and over, there were 96.7 males.

The median income for a household in the township was $38,250, and the median income for a family was $43,750. Males had a median income of $35,625 versus $20,083 for females. The per capita income for the township was $17,476.  About 3.7% of families and 6.2% of the population were below the poverty line, including 5.6% of those under age 18 and 9.8% of those age 65 or over.

See also

 List of townships in Michigan

References

External links

Townships in Huron County, Michigan
Townships in Michigan
Populated places on Lake Huron in the United States